The 114th Mahrattas were an infantry regiment of the British Indian Army. The regiment traces their origins to 1800, when they were raised as the 2nd Battalion, 7th Regiment of Bombay Native Infantry.

During World War I they were attached to the 17th Indian Division for the Mesopotamia Campaign. They took part in the action at Fat-ha Gorge on the Little Zab and the Battle of Sharqat, in October 1918.

After World War I the Indian government reformed the army moving from single battalion regiments to multi battalion regiments. In 1922, the 114th Mahrattas became the 10th (Training) Battalion 5th Mahratta Light Infantry. After independence they were one of the regiments allocated to the Indian Army.

Predecessor names 
2nd Battalion, 7th Regiment of Bombay Native Infantry - 1800
14th Bombay Native Infantry - 1824
14th Bombay Infantry - 1885
114th Mahrattas - 1903

References

Sources

Moberly, F.J. (1923). Official History of the War: Mesopotamia Campaign, Imperial War Museum. 

British Indian Army infantry regiments
Military units and formations established in 1806
Military units and formations disestablished in 1922
Bombay Presidency